Brioni may refer to:

 Brioni Islands, in Croatia
 Brioni (brand), a fashion house

See also
 Brione (disambiguation), multiple places